Bog is a wetland of mosses or lichens over waterlogged peat.

Bog or Bogs may also refer to:

Culture
 Bog (album), 1999 album by the Croatian alternative rock band Pips, Chips & Videoclips
 Bog (film), 1983 Gloria DeHaven film
 Monsters in the animated film Disney Princess: Enchanted Journey
 The Bog, 1990 song by Bigod 20
 Emperor Bog, a character in computer-animated television series the Butt-Ugly Martians

Places

 Bog, Westmoreland, Jamaica, a settlement
 Bog, Khash, a village in Sistan and Baluchestan Province, Iran
 Bog-i Ston, a village in the Tashkent province of Uzbekistan 
 Bog Meadows, an area on the outskirts of west Belfast, Northern Ireland
 Bog River, a river in New York state
 Bog Walk, a town in the parish of Saint Catherine, Jamaica
 The Bog, a former mining village in Shropshire, England

Acronyms
 Bank of Ghana, the central bank of Ghana
 British Organic Geochemical Society, an organisation that aims to promote, exchange and discuss all aspects of organic geochemistry
 El Dorado International Airport, international airport at Bogotá, Colombia, IATA code BOG
 Board of Governors

Other uses
 Bog, the word for God in most Slavic languages. (Cyrillic script: Бог; Czech: Bůh; Polish: Bóg; Slovak: Boh).
 Slang for "God" in A Clockwork Orange by Anthony Burgess
 Paal Bog (1919–2002), Norwegian economist, civil servant and diplomat
 Bogs (name), includes a list of people and fictional characters with the given name and surname
 British English colloquialism for toilet
 Tree bog, a type of pit latrine
 Australian slang for various types of putty used as a filling material in construction, vehicle body repair, etc.

See also 
 Bog pine, common name for two tree species
 Boggs (disambiguation)